Miraflores Municipality may refer to:
Miraflores, Guaviare, Colombia
Miraflores, Boyacá, Colombia

Municipality name disambiguation pages